The Cross of Recognition is a state decoration of Latvia.

History
The decoration was established in 1710 in the Duchy of Courland and Semigallia by Duke Frederick William as a symbol of the then-established Order of Recognition (l’Ordre de la Reconnaissance). According to the order's statute, it was established “in thanks to God Almighty for the recovery of Courland after the Great Northern War” (“et in memoriam recuperatae Curlandiae”). The order was bestowed for outstanding civilian and military accomplishments. Frederick William died in January 1711. No more than 18 people were awarded the order and its cross by then. After his death, no further orders were presented.

The Cross of Recognition was reestablished by the Republic of Latvia in 1938. Five classes of the order and three medals of honour were introduced, as well as a separate first level for the medal.

With the beginning of the Soviet occupation of Latvia, the bestowing of the order was halted.

After the restoration of the independence of Latvia, the decoration was restored again as the Cross of Recognition in 2004. It is awarded to Latvians and foreigners for special services in public, cultural, science, sports and education.

The ranks

References

External links
State Decorations of Latvia

Orders, decorations, and medals of Latvia
 
Duchy of Courland and Semigallia